Mick Hayde (born 20 June 1971) is an English footballer, who played as a full back in the Football League for Chester City.

References

Chester City F.C. players
Liverpool F.C. players
Altrincham F.C. players
Association football fullbacks
English Football League players
Living people
1971 births
People from St Helens, Merseyside
English footballers